Billy Pritchett (born February 22, 1951) is a former American football running back. He played for the Cleveland Browns in 1975 and for the Atlanta Falcons from 1976 to 1977.

Over the course of his career Pritchett ran 280 yards and scored one touchdown.

References

1951 births
Living people
American football running backs
West Texas A&M Buffaloes football players
Cleveland Browns players
Atlanta Falcons players